Xu Yifan and Yang Zhaoxuan defeated Asia Muhammad and Ena Shibahara in the final, 7–5, 7–6(7–4) to win the women's doubles tennis title at the 2022 Indian Wells Masters. They became the first all-Chinese team to win a WTA 1000-level title.

Hsieh Su-wei and Elise Mertens were the defending champions. Hsieh chose not to compete. Mertens partnered with Veronika Kudermetova, but lost in the first round to Eri Hozumi and Makoto Ninomiya.

Seeds

Draw

Finals

Top half

Bottom half

Seeded teams
The following are the seeded teams. Seedings are based on WTA rankings as of February 28, 2022.

Other entry information

Wildcards

Special ranking

Withdrawals
  Alexa Guarachi /  Nicole Melichar-Martinez → replaced by  Alexa Guarachi /  Sabrina Santamaria
  Barbora Krejčíková /  Kateřina Siniaková → replaced by  Kateřina Siniaková /  Clara Tauson
  Magda Linette /  Bernarda Pera → replaced by  Chan Hao-ching /  Magda Linette

References

External links
 Main draw

BNP Paribas Open – Women's doubles
Doubles women